Mikaya Thurmond is an American television journalist, who formally worked as a weekday morning anchor at WRAL-TV in Raleigh, North Carolina. An Atlanta, Georgia native, she is the daughter of Mike Thurmond and a graduate of the Henry W. Grady College of Journalism and Mass Communication at the University of Georgia. Before joining WRAL, Thurmond was a reporter at WTVC-TV.

On July 25, 2022 she announced her departure from WRAL-TV effective August 12, 2022.

References

External links
WRAL.com biography

Year of birth missing (living people)
Living people
University of Georgia alumni
American television journalists
American women television journalists
21st-century American women